Angelo Mouzouris (born 10 August 2001) is an Australian racing driver from Melbourne, Australia currently competing in the Dunlop Super2 Series with MW Motorsport, driving the No. 6 Nissan Altima L33.

Biography 

Mouzouris started karting in 2015 and two years later began his racing career in Formula Ford. In 2017, he joined Sonic Motor Racing Services and competed in National and State Formula Ford Championships. After winning the Australian Formula Ford Championship in 2019, he moved to Super2 for 2020 with Triple Eight Race Engineering.

Career results

* Season still in progress

Complete Super2 Series results

References

External links
 https://www.angelomouzouris.com.au/
 

Living people
Australian racing drivers
Supercars Championship drivers
2001 births